Kiisa is a village in Viljandi Parish, Viljandi County, Estonia. It has a population of 47 (as of 4 January 2010).

Poet, politician and doctor Johannes Vares (1890–1946) was born in Kiisa.

References

Villages in Viljandi County